Calcium modulating ligand (CAMLG or CAML), also known as calcium-modulating cyclophilin ligand, is a signalling protein recognized by the TNF receptor TACI.

Function 

The immunosuppressant drug cyclosporin A blocks a calcium-dependent signal from the T-cell receptor (TCR) that normally leads to T-cell activation. When bound to cyclophilin B, cyclosporin A binds and inactivates the key signaling intermediate calcineurin. The protein encoded by this gene functions similarly to cyclosporin A, binding to cyclophilin B and acting downstream of the TCR and upstream of calcineurin by causing an influx of calcium. This integral membrane protein appears to be a new participant in the calcium signal transduction pathway, implicating cyclophilin B in calcium signaling, even in the absence of cyclosporin.

Interactions 

CAMLG has been shown to interact with TNFRSF13B.

References

Further reading